The 1974 UEFA Cup Final was played on 21 May 1974 and 29 May 1974 between Tottenham Hotspur of England and Feyenoord Rotterdam of the Netherlands, to determine the champion of the 1973–74 UEFA Cup. Feyenoord won 4–2 on aggregate. Tottenham supporters rioted during the second leg in Rotterdam, which started after Feyenoord scored towards the end of the first half and continued into the second half.

Route to the final

In the preceding five rounds of the competition, Tottenham had never been seriously threatened with elimination, as the London-based club outscored their opponents by a total of 29 goals to 8 en route to the final. In contrast, Feyenoord Rotterdam won several narrow victories in their cup ties: they advanced on away goals against Belgian side Standard in the third round and needed extra time in the return leg to beat Polish club Ruch Chorzów in the quarter-final. Additionally, leading up to the final, Feyenoord had won only one out of five legs that were played away from their home ground, De Kuip.

This marked the second time in three years that Spurs had reached the final of a UEFA Cup, having defeated fellow English side Wolves in the inaugural final.

Match details

First leg

Second leg

After holding Spurs to a 2–2 draw at London's White Hart Lane, Feyenoord went into their home leg as favourites. Their 2–0 victory at home secured the club their first UEFA Cup title.

The second leg in Rotterdam was marred by violence and hooliganism from rioting Spurs supporters.

References

External links
RSSSF

2
Uefa Cup Final 1974
Uefa Cup Final 1974
1974
Uefa Cup Final 1974
Uefa Cup Final 1974
Uefa Cup Final
Uefa Cup Final
Uefa Cup Final
Uefa Cup Final
Sports competitions in Rotterdam
20th century in Rotterdam